Robert Andrew was one of the two Members of Parliament for Ipswich in 1391 and possibly 1393.

Andrew is thought to have been a son of William Andrew and a brother of John Andrew and James Andrew. They were a well-established family in the Stoke area, on the edge of Ipswich.

He married a woman named Alice, and they had one son

References

14th-century English people
Year of birth unknown
Year of death unknown
People from Ipswich
Andrew